Emil Wutzky (4 October 1871 in Berlin - 30 December 1963 in West Berlin) was German unionist, cooperativist and social-democratic politician. He was initially active in the Neukölln district and eventually became a city councilor of Berlin.

There is a station in the Berlin U-Bahn named after him.

1871 births
1963 deaths
Politicians from Berlin
German trade unionists
People from Neukölln